The National Federation of SubPostmasters (NFSP) is a membership organisation, which represents subpostmasters in the United Kingdom and currently has more than 8,000 members who operate approximately 9,300 post office branches. Post Office Ltd is contractually obliged to consult the NFSP on behalf of subpostmasters.

The NFSP has almost 50 branches throughout the UK, separated into 10 geographical regions. Each member is represented by their local Branch Secretary and Regional Secretary; the Board of Non-Executive Directors is made up of serving subpostmasters (each representing a UK region) and three representatives from organisations with a portfolio of post offices (WHSmith, Ryman and SPAR).

History
On 19 April 1897 a group of up to 90 subpostmasters assembled at the Music Saloon, Wood Street, Wakefield (now the Institute of Literature and Science) to consider forming a national association to “improve the conditions under which subpostmasters labour and to undertake the advancement of our interests by all legitimate and honourable means”.

The federation was formed, with Wakefield as its headquarters, and the first conference was held in Nottingham on 11 April 1898. The first edition of a monthly newspaper The SubPostmaster was published on 4 September 1899, and Joseph Ranns, founder and first National President, wrote the inaugural article. The magazine is still published today. In February 1947, the federation's headquarters moved to Shoreham-by-Sea, Sussex.

The NFSP was originally a trade union. In 2013 the Post Office stated that they did not recognise the NFSP for collective bargaining purposes.

Following a ruling of the Employment Appeal Tribunal that subpostmasters were not employees of Post Office Ltd, but were engaged under a contract for services, the Trades Union Certification Officer wrote to the NFSP to say that he believed the organisation did not meet the legal requirements to continue to be recognised as a trade union. Having rejected arguments against this by the NFSP, the Certification Officer stripped the organisation of trade union status on 13 January 2014.

Via a democratic vote, members chose overwhelmingly to reject amalgamation with other trade unions. The NFSP changed its status to a trade association on 1 October 2016.

Since 2016 membership of the NFSP has not charged a membership fee to subpostmasters. The NFSP instead receives funding from Post Office Ltd, consisting of an annual grant payment and funding for approved projects that are made under a Grant Framework Agreement introduced in 2015. The NFSP says its funding allows it to provide practical support to members but does not prevent it from challenging or criticising the Post Office.

Horizon scandal

The NSFP was criticised in April 2021 by Mr Justice Fraser for its actions in relation to the Horizon IT scandal. The judgment handed down stated that "the NFSP is not remotely independent of the Post Office, nor does it appear to put its members’ interests above its own separate commercial interests." The NFSP claimed it had been misled by the Post Office.

The NFSP later issued the following statement:

In March 2020, the parliamentary Business, Energy and Industrial Strategy Committee launched a "Post Office & Horizon inquiry" and included within the inquiry's terms of reference the question "What role did the National Federation of Sub-postmasters play in the Horizon scandal in terms of representing affected sub-postmasters?"

The statutory inquiry set up by the government in May 2021, the Post Office Horizon IT Inquiry, led by retired High Court judge Sir Wyn Williams, has within its issues to examine "What information and knowledge did [...] the National Federation of Subpostmasters [...] have about the following facts and matters during the relevant period."

References

External links
NFSP website

Defunct trade unions of the United Kingdom
1897 establishments in the United Kingdom
Postal trade unions
Trade unions established in 1897